Alyssa Rosenzweig is a software developer and software freedom activist known for her work on free software graphics drivers.

Education 
As of 2021 she studies mathematics at Innis College at the University of Toronto as a Lester B. Pearson International Scholar.

Before she attended Dougherty Valley High School, with enrichment classes at Harvard Summer School and the Center of Talented Youth.

Career 
She currently works as a software engineer at Collabora and leads the Panfrost project, developing free software OpenGL drivers for the Mali GPU to support accelerated graphics in upstream Mesa, shipping out-of-the-box on devices like the Pinebook Pro. 

In September 2020, she wrote a Linux client for the COVID-19 contact tracing used in Canada.

As an Asahi Linux developer she works on reverse-engineering the Apple GPU for the purpose of porting Linux to the Apple M1 processor to enable the development of a free software Gallium3D-based OpenGL driver targeting the "AGX" architecture found in the M1 GPU. In July 2021, Rosenzweig demonstrated Debian running bare metal on the Apple M1 with a mainline kernel.

Awards 
She is the recipient of the  2020 Award for Outstanding New Free Software Contributor and a Google Open Source Peer Bonus.

References

External links 
Personal website

Living people
Year of birth missing (living people)
Canadian software engineers
Open source people
University of Toronto people
Canadian transgender people
21st-century Canadian LGBT people